Bahner is a German surname. Notable people with the surname include:

Klaus Bahner (born 1937), German field hockey player
 Ludvik Bahner (1891-1971), Czech painter and photographer
Matt Bahner (born 1990), American soccer player
Siegfried Bahner, German football manager

German-language surnames

de:Bahner